Three Up, Two Down is a British sitcom starring Michael Elphick and Angela Thorne that ran from 1985 to 1989. It was written by Richard Ommanney.

Cast
Michael Elphick as Sam Tyler
Angela Thorne as Daphne Trenchard
Lysette Anthony as Angie Tyler (née Trenchard)
Ray Burdis as Nick Tyler
John Grillo as Wilf Perkins (series 2 onwards)
Neil Stacy as Major Giles Bradshaw (series 2 and 3)
Shaun Andrew Birrell as Baby Joe
Alexander Hill as Baby Joe
Kit Jackson as George 
Vicki Woolf as Rhonda (series 3 and 4)
Thomas Bridgland as Baby Joe Tyler
David Easter as Rob
Samantha Gnest as Baby Joe
Tim Bentinck as George
Dulcie Gray as Nanny
Jeremy Roberts as Doctor
Bobby Bragg as Commentator
Shirley Cheriton as Debbie 
Mark Gables as News vendor 
Tony O'Callaghan as Taxi Driver
John Clegg as Max
Simon Talbot as Eddy (series 3)
John Hoye as Camera Assistant (series 4)

Plot
Nick and Angie have just had a baby, and to help them financially they decide to rent out the basement. Both Nick's father, Sam Tyler, and Angie's mother, Daphne Trenchard, want the basement apartment and the only solution is to share. Sam is a Cockney, while Daphne is Cheltenham-bred and has not forgiven her daughter for marrying Nick, a 'common' photographer. Both Sam and Daphne are widowed, and stubborn. There is mutual contempt between Nick and Daphne: however, Angie is fond of Sam and is forever trying, against all the odds, to keep the peace between him and Daphne. The situation is exacerbated, from Series Two onwards, by the presence of Sam's gloomy and pessimistic zoo-keeper friend Wilf Perkins, who, after being thrown out by his mother, ends up having to share Sam's room, much to Daphne's icy displeasure. Further complications arise through Daphne's brief and disastrous romance with a neighbour, the suave and crooked Major Giles Bradshaw, who is eventually sent to prison for acts of theft and fraud.

The comedy came from the clashes between Sam and Daphne, and the eventual romance that develops between them. The next-door neighbour, Rhonda, was a catalyst for bringing them together.

Episodes

Series One (1985)
Your Place Or Mine? (15 April 85)
Widower's Mite (22 April 85)
Ill Wind From Cheltenham (29 April 85)
Epping's Not Far (6 May 85)
Just Desserts (13 May 85)
Two Down, One To Go (20 May 85)

Series Two (1986)
Major Inconvenience (7 April 86)
Sweet And Sour (14 April 86)
Arrivals And Departures (21 April 86)
It's Only Rock 'n' Roll (28 April 86)
Winner Takes All (5 May 86)
Ill Met By Candlelight (12 May 86)

Series Three (1987)
Four's A Crowd (6 September 87)
One Flew Over The Perimeter Fence (13 September 87)
Truth And Consequences (20 September 87)
Mirror Mirror On The Wall (27 September 87)
Jailhouse Shock (4 October 87)
Come Sail With Me (11 October 87)
Life And Death (18 October 87)

Series Four (1989)
Passionfruit (14 May 89)
On The Radio (21 May 89)
Omelettes And Optimism (28 May 89)
Golf (4 June 89)
The Driving Test (11 June 89)
Cheltenham (18 June 89)

American adaptation
The pilot for an American adaptation of Three Up, Two Down, titled 5 Up, 2 Down, aired on 5 June 1991 on CBS, but was not picked up as a series. Nick and Angie were played by Jeffrey D. Sams and Jackie Mari Roberts, and Angie had given birth to triplets. Sam and Daphne were played by Cleavon Little and Emily Yancy.

Home video
VHS and DVD box sets of the first two series were released on Universal Pictures' Playback imprint in the UK on 17 May 2004. As of 2020, Series 3 and 4 still remain unreleased.

References
Mark Lewisohn, "Radio Times Guide to TV Comedy", BBC Worldwide Ltd, 2003
Three Up, Two Down at British TV Comedy

External links

1980s British sitcoms
1985 British television series debuts
1989 British television series endings
BBC television sitcoms
Television series about dysfunctional families
English-language television shows